Sanjay Dina Patil (born 16 January 1969) is an Indian politician from Mumbai. He was elected to Maharashtra State assembly in 2004 from Bhandup. In 2009, he was elected to 15th Lok Sabha from Mumbai North East constituency in Maharashtra state in India, as a Nationalist Congress Party candidate. He lost the reelection for the same seat in 2014. He was succeeded by Kirit Somaiya of the Bharatiya Janata Party of India.

Sanjay Dina Patil joined Shiv Sena on 4 October 2019.

His father Dina Bama Patil was MLA from Mulund in 1985. Dina(nath) Patil had also contested elections to Vidhan Sabha unsuccessfully from Bhandup in 1978 and 1990 as Congress candidate.

References 

https://www.loksatta.com/mumbai-news/ncp-former-mp-sanjay-dina-patil-joins-shiv-sena-msr-87-1986016/

India MPs 2009–2014
Marathi politicians
Living people
1969 births
Nationalist Congress Party politicians from Maharashtra
Lok Sabha members from Maharashtra
United Progressive Alliance candidates in the 2014 Indian general election